Stray is an English hard rock band formed in 1966. Vocalist Steve Gadd (born Stephen Gadd, 27 April 1952, Shepherd's Bush, West London), guitarist Del Bromham (born Derek Roy Bromham, 25 November 1951, Acton, West London), bass player Gary Giles (born Gary Stephen Giles, 23 February 1952, North Kensington, West London) and drummer Steve Crutchley (born 1952) formed the band whilst all were attending the Christopher Wren School in London. Richard "Ritchie" Cole (born 10 November 1951, Shepherd's Bush, West London) replaced Crutchley in 1968. They signed to Transatlantic Records in January 1970.

The group's brand of melodic, hook-laden hard rock proved to be a popular draw on the local club scene during the early 1970s. However the band did not have commercial success with its record releases. At one stage Charlie Kray (brother of the Kray twins Ronnie and Reggie), was their manager. Gadd left the band in 1975 due to artistic differences and was replaced on vocals by Pete Dyer. The group's early musical style consisted of blues rock, acid rock and psychedelic rock. They then went on to join the hard rock and progressive rock movement.

The band served as the rhythm section alongside a string orchestra for the 1975 Jimmy Helms Pye LP, Songs I Sing. The original Stray finally dissolved in 1977, although Bromham later continued to play in various resurrected versions of the project well into the 2000s.  By the 2010s the band had a settled lineup again, as well as Del Bromham, Pete Dyer returned and Stuart Uren (bass) and Karl Randall (drums) were regularly gigging as Stray.  In November 2016, the band hosted a 50th Anniversary celebration concert (featuring all original members) at a sold-out London Borderline.  

In 2019, Colin Kempster replaced Stuart Uren as permanent bassist and, for live gigs, the band was also joined by Simon Rinaldo on keyboards.  After successful concerts in late 2019 and an acclaimed set at the annual Giants of Rock Festival in Minehead, Stray set out on a full joint headlining tour with Ken Pustelnik’s Groundhogs in February and March in 2020.

In 2003, Stray were the support band to Iron Maiden on several of their European dates on the Dance of Death World Tour 2003-2004. These included dates in Spain, Portugal, Poland and France. There are two other Iron Maiden connections to Stray. "All in Your Mind" from Stray's 1970 debut album was covered by Iron Maiden and was included on the 1995 reissue of No Prayer for the Dying, and Maiden bassist Steve Harris's daughter Lauren has covered "Come On Over".

From late 2006 until early 2007, the band's back catalogue of eight studio albums issued originally during the 1970s, were re-released by the UK based Sanctuary Records in compact disc format. The new releases were remastered and had bonus tracks culled from single B-sides, studio outtakes and BBC broadcast sessions.

Discography

Albums
Stray (June 1970)
Suicide (March 1971)
Saturday Morning Pictures (February 1972)
Mudanzas (May 1973)
Move It (May 1974)
Tracks (compilation with previously unreleased outtakes) (1975)
Stand Up and Be Counted (June 1975)
Houdini (March 1976)
Hearts of Fire (December 1976)
Reflecting A Generation (compilation) (1977)
Live at the Marquee (live) (1984)
New Dawn (1997)
Alive and Giggin''' (live) (1997)10 (2001)Live: In Yer face! (live) (2002)Time Machine – Anthology 1970 – 1977 (double CD collection) (2003)Valhalla (2010)Live in Japan'' (live) (2014)

References

External links
Official website

English rock music groups
English hard rock musical groups
English blues rock musical groups
English heavy metal musical groups
English progressive rock groups
Musical groups established in 1966
Musical groups from London
Pye Records artists
Dawn Records artists
Transatlantic Records artists
1966 establishments in England